Servants of Chaos is a compilation album by American heavy metal band Cirith Ungol, released under Metal Blade Records on September 5, 2001.

The album was released during the band's hiatus (which lasted from 1992–2016), and contains content from all four of their studio albums (Frost and Fire, King of the Dead, One Foot in Hell, and Paradise Lost), their 1979 self-titled demo, as well as previously unreleased live recordings of the band throughout the years.
The original release of the album contains 31 tracks, on two CD's.

The album was re-released on vinyl on November 21, 2011.

The album was re-released once again on January 31, 2012, with the addition of a bonus DVD-video of a live performance on November 9, 1984, at the Wolf & Rissmiller's Country Club—which was located in the Reseda neighborhood of Los Angeles.

The album was released for a fourth time by Metal Blade Records, digitally.

Critical reception 

The album received mostly positive reviews, with AllMusic giving it a critic score of 3/5 stars.

Track listing

References 

2001 albums
Cirith Ungol albums